Warm Beach is a census-designated place (CDP) in Snohomish County, Washington, United States. The population was 2,437 at the 2010 census.

Based on per capita income, one of the more reliable measures of affluence, Warm Beach ranks 66th of 522 areas in the state of Washington to be ranked.

Warm Beach is home to the Warm Beach Christian Camps and Conference Center, which hosts the annual Lights of Christmas festival every December.

Geography
Warm Beach is located at  (48.159856, -122.353530).

According to the United States Census Bureau, the CDP has a total area of 4.0 square miles (10.4 km), of which, 3.9 square miles (10.1 km) of it is land and 0.1 square miles (0.3 km) of it (3.23%) is water.

Demographics

As of the census of 2000, there were 2,040 people, 768 households, and 595 families residing in the CDP. The population density was 523.1 people per square mile (202.0/km). There were 866 housing units at an average density of 222.1/sq mi (85.7/km). The racial makeup of the CDP was 95.74% White, 0.15% African American, 0.64% Native American, 0.69% Asian, 0.15% Pacific Islander, 0.64% from other races, and 2.01% from two or more races. Hispanic or Latino of any race were 1.52% of the population.

There were 768 households, out of which 33.3% had children under the age of 18 living with them, 68.8% were married couples living together, 5.9% had a female householder with no husband present, and 22.5% were non-families. 17.1% of all households were made up of individuals, and 5.9% had someone living alone who was 65 years of age or older. The average household size was 2.66 and the average family size was 2.97.

In the CDP, the age distribution of the population shows 25.1% under the age of 18, 6.0% from 18 to 24, 27.9% from 25 to 44, 26.7% from 45 to 64, and 14.3% who were 65 years of age or older. The median age was 40 years. For every 100 females, there were 99.6 males. For every 100 females age 18 and over, there were 98.6 males.

The median income for a household in the CDP was $51,420, and the median income for a family was $53,611. Males had a median income of $50,240 versus $28,482 for females. The per capita income for the CDP was $26,783. About 4.1% of families and 8.9% of the population were below the poverty line, including 23.1% of those under age 18 and none of those age 65 or over.

Notable people

Graham Kerr, former television chef

References

Census-designated places in Washington (state)
Census-designated places in Snohomish County, Washington